Perkkaanpuiston Montessorikoulu (Finnish for "Perkkaanpuisto Montessori School") was a school unit within a public school offering for the very first time in Finland  proper primary school classes using the Montessori method of teaching. The school unit was run by the city of Espoo. Prior to the opening of the school unit, the Montessori method had only been used in preschools.

The school was first founded as a separate Montessori subdivision of the primary school in Lintuvaara, Espoo. In the middle 1980s it moved to its own building in Perkkaa, Espoo. The school building was a mint green wooden one-storey building divided into a large central "living room", two main classrooms and a teachers' area.

The school housed all six classes of the Finnish primary school (ala-aste) system. Because of the low number of students — only about 30 in the entire school — the classrooms were divided among the classes so that classes 1—3 had one room and classes 4—6 had another. The students also had free access to the teachers' area during breaks.

The central "living room" housed the school library and the school's pets: a couple of guinea pigs and some budgerigars.

The school building had to be torn down because of the mildew infested in the wooden walls in the late 1990s. A new standard (non-Montessori) school was built in its place and the Montessori classes moved to the Ruusutorppa primary school (Ruusutorpan ala-aste).

Schools in Finland
Education in Espoo
Former buildings and structures in Finland
Montessori schools